Stanley Paul Simon (9 July 1920 – February 1993) was a British ice hockey player. He competed in the men's tournament at the 1948 Winter Olympics.

References

External links
 

1920 births
1993 deaths
English ice hockey players
Ice hockey players at the 1948 Winter Olympics
Olympic ice hockey players of Great Britain
Sportspeople from London